King's Ely (renamed from "The King's School" in March 2012), is a co-educational public school (English private boarding and day school) and Cathedral school in the city of Ely in England. It was founded in 970 AD, making it one of the oldest schools in the world. It was given its Royal Charter by King Henry VIII in 1541. The school consists of a nursery, a pre-preparatory school, a junior school, a senior school, a sixth form, and an international school. King's Ely is a member of the Headmasters' and Headmistresses' Conference. In 2021, The Independent Schools Inspectorate published their report writing that "King's Ely achieved the highest grading possible in every category inspected and was judged to meet or exceed all regulatory standards for independent day and boarding schools."

The school has produced a number of notable alumni, including, Edward the Confessor, King of England, Lord Browne of Madingley, erstwhile chairman of British Petroleum, and James Bowman, countertenor.

King's Ely has featured in the local news for its sports results, and it has produced a bronze medal-winning Olympic athlete, Goldie Sayers, who won a Bronze Medal for Great Britain in the 2008 Summer Olympics.
Much of the senior school uses the historic monastic buildings of the cathedral, and major school events and twice-weekly services are held there. One of the boys' boarding houses, School House, is claimed to be the oldest residential building in Europe. In its entirety, the school has over 1,000 pupils. It has a small campus, with other parts in buildings near the city centre. All King's Ely sections share resources such as sports facilities and the refectory in the Monastic Barn (unless in Sixth Form where pupils eat in the Bishop's Palace).

History

General History 
King's Ely is one of seven schools established, or in some cases including this one, re-endowed and renamed, by King Henry VIII in 1541 during the Dissolution of the Monasteries. The school has its origins in the religious house founded in Ely by St Etheldreda in 673 AD. Before 1720 it was called the Ely Cathedral Grammar School. The first girls were admitted in 1970 and the school has since become fully coeducational. In 2004, Susan Freestone was appointed its first female Head, taking over from Richard Youdale who had been headmaster for 12 years. In 1973, Queen Elizabeth II came to the school to celebrate the anniversary of the monastery. The school keeps a strong link with the cathedral by which it is overshadowed, forming a key part of school life with pupils attending services in the Cathedral at least once per week in Acremont and the Junior School, and twice per week in the Senior School, and being the venue for Start of Term, End of Term, Admission of Scholars, and Prize Giving services, alongside purely religious services. A teaching institution has been on the site since 970, making it the seventh oldest school in the United Kingdom.

An article in The Illustrated London News from 1882 provided the following which showed the state of the school at that time: "The head master, after some allusion to the former history of the school (in which Edward the Confessor had been educated, and which, in the seventy years after its new foundation by Henry VIII, had developed, into a school of upwards of 300 boys, among whom were many of distinction), recounted the honours achieved in the past year. Among these were successes in the Civil Service and Indian Civil Service examination, an exhibition at Worcester College, Oxford, a first in the May examination at Queens' College, Cambridge, and a second at Peterhouse."In his memoirs from 1955, the Reverend Christopher Campling described the school's state when he became chaplain. "Academic standards were not high, but a few boys gained admission to Oxbridge each year. The music in the school was especially good, because the choristers of the cathedral choir stayed on after their voices had broken."

A Roll of Honour in School House lists 24 Old Eleans who were killed during World War I. Another Roll of Honour is located outside of the Hayward Theatre and features the names of 89 Old Eleans killed while in service of the British Armed Forces during The First World War, Second World War, and The Troubles.

Kidnapping
In November 1999, a 14-year-old pupil was kidnapped as he left the school premises, and held by three men. Police were able to stop the kidnappers' vehicle as the victim was being driven away from a hotel in Essex three days later; it is thought the boy was about to be drowned in the River Thames, as a 20 ft length of cable, ropes ties, handcuffs and a 56lb weight were found in the gang's vehicle. The parents of the boy received mobile phone calls demanding £250,000, which the police were able to trace. The men were found guilty of false imprisonment and blackmail and sentenced to custodial terms of 11–12 years.

Abolition and later Reintroduction of Rugby Union
In June 2002, the Principal Richard Youdale aroused media interest and criticism with an announcement that the school would be phasing out rugby which had been introduced in the place of football in the early 1950s. Youdale cited, among other reasons, the increasing popularity of football.  The school reinstated rugby in 2005.

Saturday school
In line with other public schools, children in year groups up to Year 5 (age 9) do not have Saturday school. Year 5 and 6 children have optional activities. Pupils in Years 7 to 11 have compulsory Saturday school while there are activities for the boarding community. However, this policy is due to be changed in the academic year starting September 2015, with lessons previously held on a Saturday being moved to the regular working week, while Saturday morning will be left free for non-academic, non-compulsory activities.

Renaming and Re-Branding 
In March 2012 the school changed its name from 'The King's School' to 'King's Ely' so as to distinguish the school from the six other King's Schools established or renamed by King Henry VIII in 1541.

List of Known Headmasters and Principals  
16th Century

 Ralph Holland (c1541 - 1562)
 James Speight (1562 - 1596)
 John Lucke (1596 - 1598)

17th Century

 Mark Holdred (1598 - 1604)
 William Pamplin (1605 - 1609)
 Daniel Wigmore (1609 - 1619)
 William Hitch (1619 - 1664)
 Charles Chadwick (1664 - 1674)
 Richard Peachey (1674 - 1681)
 Stephen Hutton (1681 - 1690)
 William Silvertop (1690 - 1699)

18th Century

 Edmund Tenant (1699 - 1725)
 Henry Gunning (1725 - 1763)
 William Irwin (1763 - 1776)
 Caesar Morgan (1776 - 1790)
 Richard Jeffreys (1790 - 1793)

19th Century

 Stephen Stephens (1793 - 1816)
 George Millers (1818 - 1833)
 Solomon Smith (1833 - 1834)
 Office Vacant (1834 - 1838)
 William Keatinge Clay (1838 - 1843)
 David James Stewart (1843 - 1848)
 James Henry Henderson (1848 - 1852)
 John Ingle (1852 - 1861)
 John Chambers (1862 - 1870)
 Richard Winkfield (1870 - 1894)

20th Century

 Frederick William Hawes (1894 - 1904)
 Edward Henry Blakeney (1904 - 1918)
 Thomas James Kirkland (1918 - 1941)
 Geoffrey John Cross (1941 - 1947)
 William Brown (1947 - 1955)
 Benjamin Edward Noble Fawcett (1955 - 1969)
 Hubert Ward (1970 - 1992)

21st Century

 Richard Youdale (1992 - 2004)
 Sue Freestone (2004 - 2019)
 John Attwater (2019 - )

Notable Buildings

The Porta
Many of Ely's monastic buildings are leased to the school by the cathedral. The imposing Porta is the gateway into the monastic buildings of the cathedral, and now houses the school's largest library, classrooms and a conference room, as well as its archive.

The Monastic Barn

The monastic barn is close to the Porta. At one time it housed the abbey's crops and tythes but it is now primarily used as the school's dining hall for pupils in year 3 to year 11. It is also used to hold formal dinners, such as the Visitor's Feast.

Prior Crauden's Chapel 

Prior Crauden's Chapel was built in 1324. Small and intimate, it retains much of its original wall decoration. It is used by the school for small congregations and private prayer, its organ played by pupils and staff.

The Queen's Hall 

Prior Crauden's Chapel is next to Queen's Hall, another 1330s building, which as the Priory housed boys aged 11–12 in the 1950s. It now serves as the residence of the Principal and his family.

The Infirmary 

The Infirmary is one of the oldest surviving of the monastery's buildings, constructed in the 12th century. Located on Firmary Lane near the south transept of the cathedral, the building once housed sick monks, but is now the boarding house for the Ely Cathedral choristers.

School House 
School House is part of the monastery, and the religious studies department is housed in the Hermitage buildings. The school uses the cathedral as a place of worship three times a week, and for major school services.

Prior's House 

Prior's House is used as a boarding house for the Junior School house, Priory House.

Old Hereward Hall 

Old Hereward Hall was built in the 1800s and is now used by the school to house classrooms, alongside a portion Wilkinson House.

Hereward Hall 

Hereward hall was originally the Ely Theological College, constructed in 1876 and used until 1964 when it transferred into the possession of the school.

Bishop's Palace

The palace was built in the 15th century by Bishop John Alcock and was one of the official residences of the Bishop of Ely until 1941. During the Second World War the palace was used as a base for the British Red Cross, and then as a home for disabled children until its closure in the 1980s. Following this the palace was purchased on a 99 year lease by the Sue Ryder Care organization, although the palace went up for sale again in 2010. Later that year King's Ely took over the lease and had the palace refurbished to be used as the school's Sixth Form Centre. It was opened by the Prince Richard, Duke of Gloucester on Friday 25 January 2013. In 1674 a Great London Plane Tree was planted by the Bishop of Ely at the time, Peter Gunning. In June 2002 the Tree Council designated the Great London Plane Tree of Ely as one of the 'Top 50 British Trees'.

School traditions

Scholars

Up to 12 of the top scholars in Year 12 are nominated as King's Scholars (boys) or Queen's Scholars (girls). Alongside the King's and Queen's Scholars there are also two International Scholars installed each year. They become members of the Cathedral Foundation and also qualify for other privileges such as being married in the Cathedral and being buried in its grounds. King's Scholars were inaugurated by Henry VIII in 1541 and Queen's Scholars at the request of Queen Elizabeth II in 1973. There is no application process for these honorary scholarships, the positions instead being awarded based on pupils' GCSE results.

The Hoop Trundle
The Hoop Trundle is performed to mark the re-founding of the school by King Henry VIII, in 1541. After he dissolved the monastery, he bestowed a royal charter on the new school and introduced the first scholars. The bowling of wooden hoops within the precincts of the cathedral, along with other games, was one of the privileges that they were afforded. Female competition was added when Queen Elizabeth II introduced Queen's scholars to the school, who have taken part since. There are both male and female heats leading to a final for which a separate tankard is awarded to both sexes. The course is a 75-yard dash to a post and back along the east lawn of Ely Cathedral bowling the hoop with a wooden stick.

The King's Barbers Valentine's Day Serenades 
Every year on the week leading up to valentine's day The King's Barbers, the school's barbershop group comprising former Ely Cathedral male choristers, will, in return for a donation to their charity of choice, serenade another pupil anonymously on the commissioning pupil's behalf either in person or online in the form of a video. The 2022 performance raised £1,413 for the Bethesda Life Center (James 1v27 Foundation).

The Bowman Lecture 
The Bowman Lecture was launched in 2014 to promote the creative and liberal arts at the school and is funded by the Old Eleans' Club. It takes place during the Michaelmas Term. It is named after James Bowman, who is an Old Elean and world-renowned counter-tenor. Since its founding, speakers have included: James Bowman, Lord Browne of Madingley, Dame Fiona Reynolds, Gus Unger-Hamilton, Richard Pinto, Dr. Harry Sidebottom, and Dr. Mathelinda Nabugodi.

The Osmond Lecture 
The Osmond Lecture is an annual event established in 1982 and endowed by the Old Elean's Club to commemorate Leonard Osmond, who taught Science at King's Ely from 1930 to 1972. Speakers in the last decade have included: Professor Lord Robert Winston, Dr. Patricia Fara, and Quentin Cooper.

'Name on a Brick' Tradition 
Every year, Sixth Form leavers are given the opportunity to carve their name into a brick of their choice around the school site, allowing each student to leave a physical mark of their time at the school.

Sword and Dagger Ely Scheme Competition 
The annual Sword and Dagger competition is a competition where the boys and girls senior houses compete to be the fastest in teams of 6 to go around the school assault course. Years 9 and 10 compete for the Dagger prizes, with a mounted dagger being awarded to the fastest boys and fastest girls house. The same system applies for Years 11-13 but they instead compete for the Sword Prizes, with a mounted sword being awarded in a similar fashion to the Dagger Competition.

Martin-Doyle Endurance Challenge 
The annual Martin-Doyle Endurance Challenge is a gruelling endurance competition where each house nominates a team of two pupils to compete in a series of mentally and physically challenging competitions involving swimming, canoeing, climbing, slacklining, and an assault course. The competition is named in memory of Kit Martin-Doyle who was one of the founders of the Ely Scheme Outdoor Education Program. In 2015 the competition, along with the wider Ely Scheme Initiative, was the subject of an article by The Telegraph as an example of the benefits of outdoor education initiatives.

Houses

Boarding houses

There are five boarding houses in the senior school, two for boys and three for girls, one of which is for the girls' choir. Hereward Hall is a boys' boarding house; previously sited opposite the Porta, it is now on Barton Square in Ely on the site of the old Cambridge theological college. It contains about 55 boys. School House, previously known as Headmaster's House as it was where the Headmaster lived, is the other boys' boarding house. It is on the Gallery, the road leading to the west end of the cathedral and houses about 60 boys. According to the school's official website, it is the "oldest inhabited residential building in Europe", although the veracity of this is uncertain. In the 1950s it also housed the refectory which then became the library which had been in the tythe barn. Etheldreda, previously called Canonry and housing boys under eleven years old, is now a girls' boarding house, established in September 2006 for the Girls Choir of Ely Cathedral, mostly senior school pupils. The house is located close to the cathedral, providing easy access for practice and performance. Hill House, situated on the corner of Barton Square and Back Hill, was until recently a boys' boarding house, being converted to housing girls as their numbers swelled. Two houses were formed on the introduction of girls into the school, Etheldreda and Withburga, the latter to house day pupils. Until September 2006, when the girls' choir house was formed, Etheldreda was the only girls' boarding house but is now the largest of all. Originally situated on Cambridge Road, it has moved to Hill House and been renamed. The current Etheldreda house was originally known as Canonry when it first split from Etheldreda (now Hill). Wendreda house was created as a dedicated boarding house for girls in years 9-11.

In the most recent Ofsted report of boarding at the school, inspectors reported that "the school provides very good care and support to boarders and there was an obvious caring culture within the boarding houses" although they said that "the school would benefit from harmonising boarding practices across the entire boarding provision."

Day houses
There are four-day houses in the senior school. Students are assigned into studies, usually with 3 or 4 others, although the number usually decreases as the pupil moves into higher years. In these studies there is a work space and storage area. There are various activities annually between houses, including sports and Ely Scheme competitions. There is also a debating competition, quiz and popular house music competition. Pupils in each house meet weekly for a meeting, and also have a personal tutor who guides them throughout their time at the school.

Curriculum
The school follows the standard curriculum of GCSE (or IGCSE) and A Levels in the senior school, in years 11 and 12–13, respectively. As well as the core subjects, the school's A Level range includes three modern languages, Latin, politics, film studies, classics, economics, psychology and philosophy of religion.

The senior school was placed 12th in Cambridgeshire for its GCSE results in 2014 (based on the percentage of pupils achieving 5+ A*-C or equivalents including A*-C in both English and mathematics GCSEs); it was placed 162nd in the independent schools' table (based on the percentage of students obtaining A*/A). The school was ranked the 210th independent school for A Level results in 2014 (based on the percentage of students obtaining A*/A or equivalent qualifications); it was placed 13th of all institutions in Cambridgeshire for A Levels (based on the percentage of students achieving at least AAB with two facilitating subjects). The meaningfulness of these league tables has been very strongly questioned as some qualifications are not taken into account when they are compiled, notably International GCSEs (IGCSE) which are frequently offered by independent schools including King's Ely as they are considered good preparation for A Levels.

Extracurricular activities
The school has a significant amount of activities encompassing a wide range of subject matters. Some of these activities include: Aerobics, Arts Award, Athletics, Badminton, Brass Ensemble, Chapel Choir, Christian Union, Chess, Concert Band, Contemporary Dance Club, Cricket, Dance Club, DaVinci Engineering Society, Duke of Edinburgh's Award (Bronze, Silver, and Gold), Ely Cathedral Girls' Choir, Ely Scheme, Equestrian, Football, Golf, Gymnasium, History Café, Hockey, Jazz Band, Kayaking, King's Barbers, King's Orchestra, Netball, Percussion Ensemble, Pilates, Rowing,  Rugby, Running Club, Spikes Cello Group, Squash, Strength and Conditioning, String Orchestra, Swimming, Tennis, The Big Thinking Club, Theatre Masterclass, Yoga, and Zumba.

Sports
King's Ely also has many sports facilities, including an artificial turf pitch, swimming pool, tennis courts, sports hall and several outdoor pitches. In 2022 plans were submitted to the council to build an additional artificial turf pitch which would according to Mark Hart, Chief Operating officer of King's Ely, be used for "hockey, football, tennis, circuit training, and more."

Other sports played include sculling, hockey, netball, basketball, squash, golf, and rounders.

Teams and individuals from the school frequently represent the school and county in their discipline. Recent successes have been seen in show jumping, football, and cross country running, among others. British Olympic Javelinist Goldie Sayers began the sport whilst at King's. Premier League and England goalkeeper Nick Pope also attended King's Ely between the years 2000 and 2008.

The major sports (The school defines major sports as sports which are available from years 3 upwards) played are:

Michaelmas Term

 Boys - Rugby Union
 Girls - Hockey

Lent Term

 Boys - Association football and hockey (Reinstated in 2019)
 Girls - Netball

Summer Term

 Boys - Cricket and tennis
 Girls - Cricket and tennis
Rowing is also available to all pupils from year 8 upwards and is available as a games option in every academic term.

Alongside the five periods of timetabled "Games" throughout the week there is also one period of timetabled physical education, where pupils do activities such as athletics, basketball, cross-country, dance, gymnastics, keep fit, swimming, tennis, badminton, and volleyball. Throughout the year there are frequent sports matches against other schools spanning from year 3 upwards.

Rugby Union 
Rugby is taught as a major sport for boys in years 3-13 and the school has seen much success, notably in 2019 with the 1st XV and the Under 15A teams completing the year's campaign without a single defeat with the 1st XV winning all 11 matches they played and as a result placing the team at the very top of the UK schoolboy rugby tables. The School's rugby program was run for almost 5 years by former Scottish Rugby player Jim Thompson.

Hockey 
Hockey is taught as a major sport to girls and boys from years 3-13 as the primary choice for girls and an alternative to football for boys. Welsh Hockey player Rebecca Daniel is a former student.

Football 
Football is taught as a major sport to all boys from years 3-13 and is also participated in by some girls on request.

Netball 
Netball is taught as a major sport from years 3-13 to all girls. In 2020, the school hosted a 'High 5 Netball Tournament' in partnership with several local state schools.

Tennis 
Tennis is available as a major sport to all boys and girls from years 3-13 and the school has had success in Lawn Tennis Association events. In 2022 the Senior Girls' team competed in the Lawn Tennis Association Schools Autumn League final against Eastbourne College, Bradfield College, and Wycombe Abbey.

Cricket 
Cricket is taught as a major sport from years 3-13. The school's Cricket Festival is a week of matches against all levels of competition at amateur, club, and school levels, ending with the 1st XI v. Old Eleans Match and the Old Eleans v. King's Ely Staff match 

The King's Enzymes is a Cricket Team made up of Old Eleans, parents, staff, and current pupils which hosts friendly internal and external games during the Summer Term against Pupil Teams, Staff Teams, and other Cricket Clubs. The team was launched in the 1990's by the then Head of Biology but eventually fizzled out until it was revived in 2022.

Athletics 
Athletics is taught both as part of the Physical Education curriculum and as a Games option. Several notable athletes have attended the school, including Olympic Medallist Goldie Sayers.

Rowing 
The school has its own boat club which is affiliated to British Rowing (boat code KSE) and its own boat house which is next to Cambridge University's on the River Great Ouse. The river is wide, straight and uninterrupted. Sculling is open to Senior School pupils and year 8 pupils, and has produced teams and single sculls that have competed at regional and national level, The club's blade design is duck egg blue with dark blue cheque.

At the 1987 British Rowing Championships the club won the men's U-16 single sculls. In 2017 at the British Rowing Championships the women's J16 quad sculls won the national title at the 2017 British Rowing Junior Championships. In 2021 the club came second place in the J18 Double Scull category of the National Schools Regatta.

Equestrian Team 
The school has its own equestrian team. Its achievements include: 7th place at the Royal Windsor Horse Show, Qualifying for the NSEA Championships several times, and 1st Place at the British Riding Club's NAF Horse Trials Qualifiers.

Music
In 2001, the Gibson Music School opened, moving the entire music department from the Hereward Hall building to the purpose-built centre adjacent to the Hayward Theatre. The new building contains a recital hall, several practice rooms, a classroom and two music technology rooms. There a number of music groups, chiefly the Chapel Choir; an Orchestra, Jazz Band and Concert Band. There is also a barber shop chorus, formed almost exclusively by boys who were choristers in the Ely Cathedral Choir. In 2006, the Ely Cathedral Girls' Choir was formed,with 18 girls from the Senior School.

The school holds an annual music festival, where pupils represent their houses in a competition, culminating in a Finalists' Concert. There is also a major school musical each year, in which the music and drama departments collaborate. A less serious music competition is held in the Michaelmas term, when all senior school houses represent themselves in a unison and ensemble class. The school offers music scholarships to pupils who show an aptitude in at least one musical discipline, and who can contribute to the school's music groups. The music department has a Concert Society, which showcases visiting professional musicians and holds concerts several times a term.

The numerous choirs and vocal groups within the school form an integral part of school life performing at major school services in the Cathedral and at many other points throughout the year. In 2022 members of the King's Ely Chamber Choir and King's Ely Chapel Choir have sung in Candlemas at St. George's Chapel, Windsor and in Evensong at St. Paul's Cathedral, London respectively.

Drama
The school has a Drama and Theatre department. In the Senior school the department is housed in a dance studio, a Black Box Studio, and the Hayward Theatre where productions are held. The Junior School has its own Drama Studio and productions are either held in the Morbey Hall or the Hayward Theatre. The department is active throughout the year with: rehearsals every evening and most weekends, Theatre Masterclasses run by professional practitioners brought in from external acting troupes, Drama and Dance clubs such as the Acting Techniques Club and the Armchair Theatre Club, academic rehearsals, and Technical Theatre Clubs. The department regularly has former pupils entering the performing-arts industry and has a growing number of candidates auditioning for Theatre Schools.

Drama is taught to all pupils in years 3-9 and optionally from year 10 onwards. In 2019 84% of pupils earnt a grade 9-7 at GCSE. For the past 5 years 100% of pupils have achieved 100% A*-B at A Level and in 2015 100% of pupils achieved an A* grade.

Each year the department's shows include: A musical theatre production, contemporary and classical studio pieces, academic showcases, open mic nights, Trinity Speech and Drama showcases, and attendance at the Edinburgh Fringe Festival. Recent productions have included: Made in Dagenham, Education Education Education, The Merchant of Venice, Much Ado About Nothing, Lord of the Flies, The Dreaming, The Lion King, Arabian Nights, Grimm Tales, Around the World in 80 Days, Frankenstein, Jesus Christ Superstar, Les Misérables, Seussical, Electra, The Electra project, Into The Woods, Grease, Whistle Down The Wind, We Will Remember Them, Joseph and the Amazing Technicolor Dreamcoat, The Cagebirds, Iphegenia in Orem, Guys and Dolls, Wendy and Peter Pan, Emil and the Detectives, Medea, Pride and Prejudice, and Legally Blonde: The Musical.

In 2019 the school took the production Ugly Youth written by then Director of Drama and Theatre, Nick Huntington, to the Edinburgh Fridge Festival where it earnt a 5 star review from reviewer Richard Beck for the Broadway Baby. In 2017, the school's first performance at the Fringe Festival, a production of 'The Dreaming', was awarded 5 stars by James Taylor of The Edinburgh Reporter.

The Ely Scheme
The Ely Scheme is the schools outdoor education initiative which has been running as an alternative to the Combined Cadet Force for over 30 years. Since its inception, it has developed into a unique outdoor adventure programme with its own timetabled activities for Years 9. Its aim is to develop self-confidence, team-working, problem-solving and personal skills in a variety of activities. Pupils have the opportunity to become Ely Scheme leaders as they move up the school. Many choose to embark on The Duke of Edinburgh's Award.

King's Ely has a dedicated climbing wall, bouldering cave, and all-terrain course, as well as access to an even larger obstacle course at nearby Braham Farm. In recent years, the school's climbing club has travelled to Corsica, the Alps and the Himalayas.

Throughout the year there are many competitions spanning from Year 8-13 beginning with the Humphries Challenge in Year 8 which is a test of strength, courage, strategy, teamwork, and communication skills. The competition is named in memory of Christopher Humphries who had a love of outdoor learning and who was heavily involved in the Ely Scheme Initiative. In Year 9 pupils compete in the Ely Scheme challenge which tests the skills the pupils have learned in their year of Ely Scheme Lessons. In 2015 the Ely Scheme Initiative was the subject of an article by The Telegraph as an example of the benefits of outdoor education initiatives.

King's Ely Junior 
The school has its own junior school, which is separate from the senior school, although shares many of its facilities. It has around 357 pupils from Year 3 (approximately 7) to Year 8 (aged 13). The junior school has its own faculty of staff, own administration and management and a self-contained block of classrooms. This was complemented in 2003 by a new building which contained classrooms and other facilities, primarily for Year 7 and 8 pupils. The majority of Year 8 pupils can expect to transfer into King's Senior School. The Head of the junior school is R Whymark.

Like many independent schools, the junior school has a house system, with each pupil belonging to one. It forms an integral part of life at the school and there are frequent inter-house events in sports as well as the arts. All boarding pupils in Priory and Walsingham (Choir) House are also affiliated to a day house for everyday school activities, such as house meetings and competitions. Walsingham House was previously known as Choir house until September 2021 when its name was changed to reflect the fact that it no longer housed just choristers but also other boarders.

King's Ely Acremont 
King's Acremont Nursery and Pre-Prep occupies a Georgian-style house on Egremont Street, a ten-minute walk from the main campus. Children are admitted to the nursery from age one and almost all pupils transfer into Year 3 of King's Junior School at age seven. Acremont pupils join the rest of the school for major events in the cathedral where they stage their annual Christmas production. Acremont received an 'excellent' rating in its 2003 Ofsted inspection, with inspectors saying "Young children are given an excellent start to their education ... the warm, welcoming environment promotes learning and there is an excellent relationship between children, parents and teachers."

King's Ely International
King's Ely International was started primarily as a link school, so that students who had little English–speaking ability could accustom themselves to the language before going on to the senior school or another English-speaking public school, normally in the sixth form. The centre offers both two and one-year GCSE programmes. The centre recommends that students attend the summer school preceding their arrival, which includes basic English as well as social activities to helps adapt to English culture. In the last 3 years, King's Ely has integrated the study centre into the main school, with more shared activities in sports and academia. The study centre uses many of the main schools facilities like the dining hall and sports facilities, despite being, physically at least, relatively isolated from the rest of the school—opposite the Oliver Cromwell Museum near the cathedral. The termly fees for the study centre are £8400, or £25,200 per year, plus a refundable deposit of £3000. There were 51 pupils in attendance in the academic year 2012–2013.

Fairstead House
On March 22, 2022, The Governing Bodies of King's Ely and Fairstead House, a coeducational independent school in Newmarket with pupils between the ages of 4 and 11 years, announced a merger of the schools' respective charities. This formalised a longstanding relationship between the two schools. Although the schools will now be under the oversight of a single Governing Body, which includes two Governors from Fairstead House, both schools remain autonomous on a day-to-day level retaining their identities.

Fees and charitable status
Annual fees are up to about £27,000 per year for boarders or about £34,000 for international boarders (2014–15). Like most public schools, King's is a non-profit educational body and a registered charity, and as such benefits from substantial tax breaks. It was calculated by David Jewell, master of Haileybury, that in 1992 such tax breaks save the school about £1,945 per pupil per year. The school offers bursaries and allowances, £1,575,525 was provided in 2013, and scholarships which totalled £304,197. These include music scholarships—amounting to around two-thirds for choristers whilst serving in the Cathedral Choir, and a third scholarship upon their continuation as a pupil in the Senior School. There are further major and minor scholarships for music, sports and academic performance. The Senior School occasionally offers a large major scholarship for a promising organist or musician who is of a particularly high quality. Like many public schools, King's offers fee reductions when more than one child attends, and to the children of staff members. There also bursaries for children of the Clergy, Armed Forces and to those who would otherwise not be able to afford it, on a means tested basis. Over a third of all pupils receive some sort of financial award, be it a bursary or a scholarship, with 355 individuals benefiting in 2013.

School finances
Information about income and expenditure for the last five years is available to the public on the Charity Commission website. Income has steadily increased over recent years and as such expenditure has increased accordingly, excluding the disruption caused by the Covid-19 Pandemic.

Scholarships 
Scholarships are available at two points in the school, that being the entry into Senior School (Year 9) and entry into the Sixth Form (Year 12). For Year 9 the scholarships available are: Academic, Art, Dance, Drama, Music, Sports, ECGC (Ely Cathedral Girls' Choir), and STEM. In Sixth Form the scholarships available are: Academic, Art, Dance, Drama, Music, Sports, STEM, ECGC, Female Choral, Male Choral, and Organ. The application process generally consists of an assessment and an interview occurring the year before the scholarship takes effect.. Scholarships are awarded of up to 10% of day tuition fees.

Ely Cathedral Choir

The boy and girl choristers of Ely Cathedral are all educated at and boarders of the school. The boy choristers number between 18 and 22 boys, varying per year. The boy choristers sing Evensong four nights during the week, evensong on Saturday and Sunday, as well as a Morning Service on Sundays. They practise in the mornings before school. The choristers are joined to day houses as well as their boarding house, Walsingham (Choir) House. The choir is currently under the directorship of Edmund Aldhouse.

The boy choristers are aged between 7 years old and 13 years. Two members of the group, Patrick Aspbury and CJ Porter-Thaw who formed part of The Choirboys, were Ely Cathedral choristers. The choir has toured many countries in the past, including the United States, Canada, Malta as well as extensively in mainland Europe. The choir is also regularly engaged in concerts, both in the cathedral as well as other prestigious venues (such as the Royal Albert Hall) and has produced a number of Compact Discs.

Ely Cathedral Girls' Choir was established in 2006, comprising twenty girl choristers drawn from both the Junior School and the Senior School, in Years 7-11 (ages 11–16). The girl choristers sing two Evensong per week, and do full weekend duties once or twice a month. Since September 2010, the girls' choir has been directed by Sarah MacDonald.

There are six permanent Layclerks who sing Alto, Tenor, and Bass for both top lines. They are supplemented by additional singers on Sundays and for major feasts, and there are also a number of Sixth Form Choral Scholars who are also pupils at King's Ely. The cathedral appointed its first female layclerk in January 2019.

In his memoirs, Christopher Campling described the voice of the boys in 1955 as "something different" from other Cathedral Choirs: "Michael Howard [the director of music] purposely produced a tone for the boys which was halfway between the continental guttural sound produced from the chest voice, and the pure hard tone of the traditional English cathedral treble, as found at King's College, Cambridge. The "Ely Sound" was harsher than King's, more flexible, more vigorous, always excellent in enunciation."

Old Eleans
Old Eleans (Former pupils of the school) are organised under the Old Eleans' Club, founded in 1889, which holds events during the year for Old Eleans to meet and remain involved with the school. These include an annual black-tie dinner, a drinks event in the spring, the Old Elean vs Staff Cricket Match, the Old Elean vs King's Ely XI Cricket match, a Netball match, a Golf day, a barbeque, and a Rowing event. The Old Eleans club helps to raise donations for the school having in the last decade donated a Lightweight Double Rowing shell, donating £10,000 to the School's Harship Fund, and supporting the creation of a garden designed by Chelsea Award Winner Kamelia Zaal. Many Old Eleans participate in the Enzymes Cricket Team.

Notable Old Eleans

Politics 

 Richard FitzNeal, Lord High Treasurer, 1156–1196 
 Sir Antony Buck, QC, Conservative MP
 Tom Hunt, serving Member of Parliament for Ipswich
 Thomas Willett, first mayor of New York.
 Syed Iftikar Bokhari, Pakistani politician and cricketer
 Desmond Crawley, British diplomat 
 Sir Guy Pilling, British colonial administrator and Governor of St Helena
 Clifford Henry Fitzherbert Plowman, British Diplomat and Colonial Service administrator

Royalty and nobility 

 Edward the Confessor, King of England, 1042–1066
 Sir Robert Fairbairn, 7th Baronet

Businesspeople 

 Lord Browne of Madingley, former CEO of British Petroleum
 Tonye Cole, Nigerian businessman
 Oswald Sanderson, English Businessman known for the Wilson Line of Hull

Legal Professionals 
 Dame Joanna Smith, British High Court Judge

Writers 

 Harry Sidebottom, author and historian
 Patrick Collinson, historian
 Aschlin Ditta, television and film writer
 Andrew Taylor, author
 John Tipler, automotive writer
 Jeremy Taylor, English writer, editor, and publisher
 Gytha Lodge, Sunday Times bestselling writer and multi-award winning playwright

Scientists and Medical Professionals 

 Suzy Lishman CBE, former President of the Royal College of Pathologists
 William Sole, British Apothecary and botanist
 Harry Swift, English medical practitioner and researcher
 Robert Chartham, sexologist

Journalists and television presenters 

 Matthew Amroliwala, BBC News 24 newsreader
 Nigel Colborn, broadcaster and gardening expert, former presenter of BBC Gardeners' Question Time
 Julian Bennett, television presenter, best known for British Queer Eye and The Only Way Is Essex

Musicians 

 James Bowman, English countertenor and former Ely Cathedral chorister
 Gus Unger-Hamilton, Keyboardist for the Indie Rock Band alt-J
 David Pickard, Director of the BBC Proms, and Former Director of the Glyndebourne Opera
 Darren Jeffery, English Bass-baritone singer

Actors, directors and producers 

 Ed Blum, film director, known for the film Scenes of a Sexual Nature
 Richard Everitt, Television and film producer, with credits including Coronation Street
 Fiona Laird, Theatre director, composer, and writer.
 Hugh Miles, cinematographer and filmmaker, specialising in wildlife films
 Alan Yentob, television executive, producer and presenter of BBC's Imagine series

Artists and designers 

 Aubrey Powell, designer, noted for designing Led Zeppelin's Houses of the Holy album cover
 Edward Stott, Painter
 Rupert Sanderson, British shoe designer

Armed forces 

 Donald Kingaby, World War II flying ace
 Commander Alwyn Thomas Lavender Covey-Crump, author of Alphabetical Glossary of Naval Terms and Abbreviations.
 John W. R. Taylor, British Kremlinologist and military aviation expert

Sportspeople 

 Oliver Jarvis, British racing driver and winner of the 2022 24 Hours of Daytona
 Benedict Jackson, English professional golfer
 Oliver Oakes, Team Principal and Director of Hitech GP, 2005 World Karting Champion, and former British Formula Three and GP3 racing driver
 Goldie Sayers, Olympic medallist – Javelin
 Nick Pope, England and Premier League goalkeeper
 Rebecca Daniel, Welsh hockey player
 Alan Gregory, Scottish Rugby Union player in the 2018 Six Nations Championship
 William Burns, Cricketer 
 Henry Luddington, Cricketer

Others 

 Dr Frances Ward, Dean of St Edmundsbury, Cathedral of Bury St. Edmunds
 Harry Barton, Archdeacon of Sudbury
 James Bentham, English Clergyman and Historian of Ely Cathedral

See also
List of the oldest schools in the world
The King's School, Canterbury
The King's School, Chester
The King's School, Gloucester
The King's School, Peterborough
The King's School, Rochester
The King's School, Worcester

Notes and references

External links

A history of the choristers of Ely Cathedral
Ely Cathedral Choir website
Profile on the Independent Schools Council website

Private schools in Cambridgeshire
Boarding schools in Cambridgeshire
Member schools of the Headmasters' and Headmistresses' Conference
Educational institutions established in the 1540s
10th-century establishments in England
Choir schools in England
Church of England private schools in the Diocese of Ely
Ely, Cambridgeshire
Schools with a royal charter
Educational institutions established in the 10th century
970 establishments
Buildings and structures in Cambridgeshire
Cathedral schools
Charities based in Cambridgeshire
People educated at King's Ely
Ely Cathedral